Muhammad Usman (born 4 April 1971) is a Pakistani field hockey player. He competed in the men's tournament at the 1996 Summer Olympics.

References

External links
 

1971 births
Living people
Pakistani male field hockey players
Olympic field hockey players of Pakistan
Field hockey players at the 1996 Summer Olympics
Place of birth missing (living people)
Commonwealth Games medallists in field hockey
Commonwealth Games bronze medallists for Pakistan
Asian Games medalists in field hockey
Asian Games bronze medalists for Pakistan
Medalists at the 1994 Asian Games
Field hockey players at the 1994 Asian Games
Field hockey players at the 2002 Commonwealth Games
2002 Men's Hockey World Cup players
1998 Men's Hockey World Cup players
20th-century Pakistani people
Medallists at the 2002 Commonwealth Games